Christian Albrecht Jackhelln (28 July 1784 – 11 September 1868) was a Danish born, Norwegian merchant and politician.

Biography
Christian was born in Aalborg, Denmark to Anton Heinrich von Jackhelln and Pauline Sofie Jegind. He  settled in Bodin in Nordland, Norway where he established his own trading company, Christian Jakhelln AS. His company became one of the leading wholesaler and trade companies in Bodin from 1816 until his death in 1868. The firm was taken over by his son Carl Johan (1827–1902), and later by his grandson Christian Albrecht Jakhelln (1863–1945).

Jackhelln was a member of the first City Council and was elected to the Norwegian Parliament in 1833 from the constituency of Nordlands Amt. He was later re-elected in 1845 and 1851.

Personal life
In 1816 he married Anne Fredrikke Winther (1796–1858), daughter of the district surgeon Johan Friederich Winter and his first wife Anne Margrethe Woche.  They had 11 children.

References

1784 births
1868 deaths
Businesspeople from Aalborg
Politicians from Bodø
Danish emigrants to Norway
Members of the Storting
Nordland politicians
19th-century Norwegian businesspeople
Norwegian company founders
Norwegian merchants
Politicians from Aalborg